Femi Opabunmi (born 3 March 1985) is a Nigerian former footballer.

Career
He played for a few clubs, including Shooting Stars FC, Grasshoppers Zürich (Switzerland), Hapoel Be'er Sheva and Chamois Niortais in France. He studied at Methodist High School Ibadan and played for the Methodist High School Ibadan Old Boys.

He retired from football in 2006 due to serious glaucoma. He is now totally blind in right eye.

Femi Opabunmi is now the Head Coach of a Football academy in Iwo, Osun State, Alamu Football Academy, the first free football academy which is set to participate in the Nigerian Premier league.

International career 
Opabunmi scored a goal to help Nigeria win the African U-17 Championships in 2001. With Collins Osunwa out with injury he became Nigeria's key player at 2001 FIFA U-17 World Championship where he scored a hat-trick against Australia and won him the Silver Shoe as second highest goalscorer and also the Bronze Ball as third best player in the tournament, helping Nigeria to reach the final where they lost to France. He attracted attention from clubs such as Manchester United, Lyon and Celta Vigo.

He played for Nigeria and made his debut in 2002 against Kenya scoring the second goal in a 3-0 win. He was a participant at the 2002 FIFA World Cup playing against England in the last group stage match becoming the 3rd youngest player to ever play in the World Cup finals after Norman Whiteside and Samuel Eto'o. Thereafter, he has not been called again for the national team.

References

1985 births
Nigerian footballers
2002 FIFA World Cup players
Israeli Premier League players
Living people
Yoruba sportspeople
Sportspeople from Lagos
Nigeria international footballers
Hapoel Be'er Sheva F.C. players
Expatriate footballers in Israel
Chamois Niortais F.C. players
Shooting Stars S.C. players
Grasshopper Club Zürich players
Association football midfielders